McCoig is a surname. Notable people with the surname include:

Archibald McCoig (1873–1927), Canadian politician
Robert S. McCoig (1937–1998), Scottish badminton player